Ballantrushal is a village on the Isle of Lewis in the West Side district, in the Outer Hebrides, Scotland. Ballantrushal is within the parish of Barvas, and is situated on the A857.  The standing stone Clach an Trushal is beside the village. and was the site of the last battle between the Lewis Macaulays and Morrison clans.

References

External links

Canmore - Lewis, Ballantrushal site record
Canmore - Lewis, Clach An Trushal site record
Canmore - Lewis, Shader, Ballantrushal site record

Villages in the Isle of Lewis